Baron Mauley was a title of nobility in the peerage of England, named after the medieval Mauley family of barons in Yorkshire, who had their seat at Mulgrave Castle. The family had been established in England by Peter de Maulay (one of King John's "evil counsellors") in the 13th century. It was his grandson, Peter Mauley III, who was created "Baron Mauley" on 24 June 1295 by a writ of summons to parliament. The barony fell into abeyance in 1415.

In the 19th century, a new title, Baron "de Mauley", was created for a descendant of one of the co-heirs of the Mauley barony.

Barons Mauley (1295)
 Peter Mauley, 1st Baron Mauley (1249–1308)
 Peter Mauley, 2nd Baron Mauley (1281–1336?), son of preceding
 Peter Mauley, 3rd Baron Mauley (c. 1300–1355), son of preceding
 Peter Mauley, 4th Baron Mauley (c. 1331–1383), son of preceding
 Peter Mauley, 5th Baron Mauley (c. 1378–1415), grandson of preceding
The fifth baron's nephew, Ralph Bigod (1410–1461), who inherited Mulgrave castle, was sometimes styled "Lord Mauley". He was slain at the Battle of Towton, 1461.

Citations

References
 
 
 
 
 

1295 establishments in England
Noble titles created in 1295
Abeyant baronies in the Peerage of England